The Liebermann–Burchard or acetic anhydride test is used for the detection of cholesterol. The formation of a green or green-blue colour after a few minutes is positive.

Lieberman–Burchard is a reagent used in a colourimetric test to detect cholesterol, which gives a deep green colour. This colour begins as a purplish, pink colour and progresses through to a light green then very dark green colour. The colour is due to the hydroxyl group (-OH) of cholesterol reacting with the reagents and increasing the conjugation of the un-saturation in the adjacent fused ring. Since this test uses acetic anhydride and sulfuric acid as reagents, caution must be exercised so as not to receive severe burns.

Method:  Dissolve one or two crystals of cholesterol in dry chloroform in a dry test tube. Add several drops of acetic anhydride and then 2 drops of concentrated H2SO4 and mix carefully.
After the reaction is finished, the concentration of cholesterol can be measured using spectrophotometry.

References
 Campbell, Mary K. & Shawn O. Farrell. Biochemistry. (4th ed.). Singapore: Thomson Asia Pte Ltd. (2005).
 http://www.clinchem.org/cgi/reprint/20/7/794.pdf

Medical tests